0.9 is the fourth album by French rapper Booba and released on November 24, 2008, on Tallac Records via the major Barclay Records / Universal Music Group.

Track listing

Streaming Bonus Track

Charts

References

Booba albums
2008 albums
French-language albums
Universal Music France albums
Barclay (record label) albums
Tallac Records albums